Timothy or Tim Holt may refer to:

Timothy Holt (1836–1912), American pioneer, settled village of Holts Summit, Missouri 
Tim Holt (1919–1973), American actor
Tim Holt (statistician) (1943–2022), British statistician
Tim Holt (American football) (born 1972), American football coach

See also
Holt (surname)